Mystery theater or Mystery theatre could refer to:
 ABC Mystery Theater, radio program and television series, 1951–54
 CBS Radio Mystery Theater, radio program, 1974–82
 Crawford Mystery Theatre, TV program, 1951–21
 Mollé Mystery Theatre, radio program, 1943–48

See also